Shilton Sydney D'Silva (born 15 September 1992) is an Indian professional footballer who currently plays as a midfielder for Gokulam Kerala in the I-League.

Career

Early career
Born in Mumbai (Bombay), D'Silva was discovered playing football for his school team, the St Pius X High School (Bombay), shortly thereafter he was selected to play for state-level tournaments in the Maharashtra U14 team. After playing for the state during a 10-day football festival, D'Silva joined the youth set-up of I-League side Mahindra United. While with Mahindra United, D'Silva played for the under-15 side in the Manchester United Premier Cup. Then, when Mahindra United U15s played against the India U16 side D'Silva was spotted by youth coach Colm Toal and was thus selected to join the India youth set-up.

Pailan Arrows
In 2010, after the disbanding of Mahindra United, D'Silva was selected to play for the Pailan Arrows, then known as AIFF XI, of the I-League. This team would be a team full of under-23 players in preparation for the 2018 FIFA World Cup. D'Silva made his professional debut for AIFF XI on 1 December 2010 against Chirag United in which AIFF XI fell 1–2 in their first ever game. He then scored his first professional goal on 22 December 2010 against Air India FC. His 34th-minute strike helped AIFF XI win 2–1. He then scored his second goal of the season against Dempo with a 10th-minute goal that lead to a 1–1 draw against the champions.

On 20 December 2011, during a Federation Cup (India) match against Mumbai FC, D'Silva suffered an ACL tear. This injury lead him to miss the 2011–12 I-League season. After a year out, D'Silva rejoined the team in November 2012, however, in a friendly match against Mohammedan, challenge by Phoolchand Hembram left D'Silva with a broken tibia and fibula. This led to another surgery which meant that D'Silva would miss the 2012–13 I-League season, the last ever season for Pailan Arrows.

Rehab
After the disbandment of Pailan Arrows, D'Silva took a break from football to focus on his education and finish his exams. After completing graduation, former India national under-19 football team head coach, Colm Toal, recommended D'Silva to complete his rehab at the AIFF Academy in Goa. D'Silva said "The rehab went perfectly. I will remain indebted for life to the physiotherapists who helped me there. AIFF took care of all my expenses and Colm has also always been a pillar of support".

Bengaluru FC
Before the 2014–15 season, D'Silva was signed by reigning I-League champions Bengaluru FC.

Mumbai FC (loan)
On 31 March 2015, D'Silva signed for fellow I-League club Mumbai FC on loan from Bengaluru FC. He appeared on the bench for the team on 3 April against Shillong Lajong. He did not play as Mumbai fell 6–0. D'Silva then made his first professional appearance in four years on 22 April against Sporting Goa. He came on as an 85th-minute substitute for Climax Lawrence as Mumbai drew 1–1.

After the season finished, D'Silva returned to his parent club before being released. However, soon after being released, it was announced that D'Silva would be available for selection during the 2014 Indian Super League domestic draft.

Mumbai
On 27 February 2016, D'Silva made another return to professional football, appearing on the bench for Mumbai in an I-League match against Sporting Goa.

On 6 December 2016 D'Silva made his season debut for Mumbai in their opening MDFA Elite Division match against Mumbai Customs. D'Silva started the match as Mumbai came out 8–3 winners.

Mohun Bagan
On 24 July 2017 it was announced that D'Silva had signed with I-League side Mohun Bagan. He made his debut for the club in their opening I-League match on 25 November 2017 against Minerva Punjab. He started and played the whole match as Mohun Bagan drew 1–1.

Mohammedan SC
Mohammedan SC (Kolkata) signed Shilton D'Silva from Mohun Bagan on January 4, 2021, for I-league season 2020-21.

International
After playing for Mahindra United U15 against the India U16 side, D'Silva was spotted and selected by Colm Toal to join the India youth set-up. He represented the India U16 side during the 2008 AFC U-16 Championship and then participated with the India U19 side during the qualifiers for the 2010 AFC U-19 Championship. On 23 February 2011, D'Silva made his debut for the India U23 team against Myanmar U23 during the 2012 Summer Olympics qualifiers.

D'Silva then made his debut for the India senior team on 21 March 2011 against Chinese Taipei in the 2012 AFC Challenge Cup qualifiers. He came on a substitute for Rakesh Masih as India won 3–0.

Career statistics

Honours
Bengaluru FC
Federation Cup: 2014–15
Mohun Bagan
I-League: 2019–20
Calcutta Football League: 2018–19
Sikkim Gold Cup: 2017
Rajasthan United
Baji Rout Cup: 2022

References

1992 births
Living people
Footballers from Mumbai
Indian footballers
Indian Arrows players
Bengaluru FC players
Mumbai FC players
Mohun Bagan AC players
Association football midfielders
I-League players
India international footballers
India youth international footballers
Maharashtra football team players
Rajasthan United FC players